Berta Rojas (born 23 September 1966) is a Paraguayan classical guitarist that won two Latin Grammy Awards on 2022 in its 23rd edition with her latest album entitled "Legado", the first in the "Best Classical Music Album" category, becoming the first Latin Grammy for Paraguay, and the second award in the "Best Contemporary Classical Composition" category for Anido's Portrait: I. Chacarera, composed by Sergio Assad, who was commissioned by the guitarist to write a piece in tribute to María Luisa Anido.  In 2012 she was nominated for Best Instrumental Album in the Latin Grammys for her album "Día y Medio (A Day and a Half)" which she recorded with Paquito D’Rivera. For her album "Salsa Roja (Red Sauce)", she was nominated at the 2014 Latin Grammy Awards in the category of Best Classical Album. She got her third nomination in the 16th Annual Latin Grammy Awards for Best Tango Album for her album "History of Tango", which she recorded with the iconic Camerata Bariloche.

Background and education
Berta Rojas was praised for having “introduced a new dimension in the emotional reaches of the instrument,” according to El País newspaper in 1991. Since then she has gone on to build an international career and was lauded by the Washington Post as a "guitarist extraordinaire" and by Classical Guitar Magazine as "ambassador of the classical guitar."

She had her first music lessons with guitarist Emiliano Aiub Riveros. She then studied guitar briefly with Carlos Vázquez, and began her formal education in classical guitar at age 10 under the instruction of Felipe Sosa and Violeta de Mestral.  At the same time, she also studied piano with Rosa Mereles de López at the Jorge Báez Conservatory.

Rojas moved to Uruguay in 1986 to continue her studies with Uruguayan professor Abel Carlevaro. There she enrolled in the Escuela Universitaria de Música (Universidad de la República), where she obtained a Bachelor of Music in Classical Guitar, studying under guitarist Eduardo Fernández and Mario Paysée.

In 1996, Rojas was named a Fellow of the Americas by the Kennedy Center for the Performing Arts for her artistic excellence. This recognition helped her acquire the means to continue her formal education in the United States. That same year, she began her graduate studies at the Peabody Institute. In 1997 she received a scholarship from the Organization of American States which financed her remaining studies. She received a Master of Music from Peabody Institute under the instruction of Manuel Barrueco and Ray Chester. In 2000, Rojas received her Graduate Performance Diploma at the same institution under Barrueco and Julian Gray.

Musical career
Rojas has performed at various venues around the world, including at the National Concert Hall in Dublin as a soloist with the Irish Radio and Television Orchestra (RTO), and on Belgian National Television with the Brussels Philharmonic Orchestra. Since 2011, Rojas has toured through 20 countries in the Americas with Cuban saxophonist and 11-time Grammy award winner Paquito D'Rivera on the "In the Footsteps of Mangoré" tour. Together, Rojas and D’Rivera recorded and released Día y Medio (A Day and a Half), an album which earned a nomination for "Best Instrumental Album" in the 13th Latin Grammy's in 2012. She has also frequently toured with Brazilian guitarist Carlos Barbosa-Lima.

Rojas' twelve regular studio recordings began with the 1998 album Intimate Barrios, that was included in Gramophone Magazine's list of "the best recordings you can buy." Her 2006 release "Cielo Abierto" was praised by Soundboard Magazine as "impeccable in every aspect of professionalism—heart-touching musical artistry, interesting repertoire and excellent technical production." 2009's "Terruño" has received excellent reviews by critics internationally. Steve Marsh of Classical Guitar Magazine commended "Terruño" for exhibiting a "poetic exquisiteness which many another player rarely attains."

In May 2015, Berta Rojas received the distinction of "Maestros del Arte", the "Embajadora Ilustre del Arte Musical" distinction by the Paraguayan Senate, and the award of "La Ordena Nacional al Mérito Comuneros", by the Chamber of Deputies Paraguay. On 18 May 2015 she released her album "History of Tango", along with the iconic Camerata Bariloche.

In 2016 the Autonomous University of Encarnación and the Universidad Americana of Asunción bestowed upon her Honorary Doctorate Degrees. And for her outstanding work on behalf of culture, the Ministry of Foreign Affairs awarded her the National Order of Merit “Don José Falcón” in 2017.

On 8 May 2017 she presented her album entitled "Felicidade", in homage to Brazilian music, with the collaboration of the outstanding artists Gilberto Gil, Toquinho and Iván Lins.

On 4 July 2017, she received the Carlos Colombino award, granted by the National Secretariat of Culture of Paraguay in recognition of her contribution to Paraguayan culture.

In August 2017 she became the first Latin American guitar teacher in the Guitar Department at the Berklee College of Music.

In June 2018 she joined the renowned Australian guitarist John Williams in a tribute to Agustín Barrios Mangoré at the Sam Wanamaker theater of the Shakespeare's Globe cultural complex in London.

Activism promoting the development and appreciation of musical arts

Discography 
 Berta Rojas interprets Agustin Barrios – Clave Ediciones. Paraguay, 1992
 Concierto Latinoamericano – Paraguay, 1995
 Concierto Latinoamericano – Dorian Recordings, USA, 1997
 Intimate Barrios – Dorian Recordings. USA, 1998
 Guitarra Adentro – Paraguay, 2002
 Cielo Abierto – ON Music Recordings. USA, 2006
 Alma y Corazón – ON Music Recordings. USA, 2007
 Flores de Asunción – ON Music Recordings. USA, 2008
 Paraguay According to Agustin Barrios – ON Music Recordings. USA, 2008
 Terruño – ON Music Recordings – USA, 2009
 Día y Medio – ON Music Recordings. USA, 2012
 Salsa Roja – ON Music Recordings. USA, 2013
 Historia del Tango (History of Tango) – ON Music Recordings. USA, 2015
 Felicidade (Happiness) – ON Music Recordings. USA, 2017
 Legado - ON Music Recordings. USA, 2022

References 

Bruzual, A. (2012). La Guitarra en Venezuela. Desde sus orígenes hasta nuestros días [Guitar in Venezuela. From its origin until our days]. Caracas: Central Bank of Venezuela
González Palacios, E., Podetti, M., Rovatti, D., & Muñoz, I. (1998). Lengua y Literatura 7 [Language and Literature 7]. Asunción: Santillana S.A.
Quevedo, O. (2005). Forgers of Paraguay. Asunción: Arami Grupo Empresarial
Starling, W. (2012). Strings Attached. The life & music of John Williams. London: The Robson Press
Stover, R. (2002). Six Silver Moonbeams. The Life and Times of Agustín Barrios Mangoré. El Salvador: Fundación María Escalon de Nuñez.

External links 
 Official site of Berta Rojas
 Official fanpage of Berta Rojas
 Berta Rojas on Spotify
 Berta Rojas on YouTube
 Berta Rojas on Twitter
 Berta Rojas on Instagram
 Berta Rojas on Soundcloud
 Berta Rojas on Google+
 Berta Rojas on About.me
 In the Footsteps of Mangoré Project
 Touring Schools in Paraguay
 Press articles
 On Music Recordings
 Pu Rory Ensemble

1966 births
20th-century classical musicians
Living people
Paraguayan classical guitarists
Women classical guitarists
20th-century guitarists
21st-century classical musicians
21st-century women musicians
People from Asunción
Paraguayan women musicians
Women in Latin music
20th-century women guitarists
Latin Grammy Award winners